

Robert (Mouseman) Thompson (7 May 1876 – 8 December 1955), also known as Mousey Thompson, was a British furniture maker. He was born and lived in Kilburn, North Yorkshire, England, where he set up a business manufacturing oak furniture, which featured a carved mouse on almost every piece.

It is claimed that the mouse motif came about accidentally in 1919 following a conversation about "being as poor as a church mouse", which took place between Thompson and one of his colleagues during the carving of a cornice for a screen. This chance remark led to him carving a mouse and this remained part of his work from this point onwards.

Thompson was part of the 1920s revival of craftsmanship, inspired by the Arts and Crafts movement led by William Morris, John Ruskin and Thomas Carlyle. More specific to furniture making in this genre and era include Stanley Webb Davies of Windermere.

The workshop, now being run by his descendants, includes a showroom and visitors' centre, and is located beside the Parish Church, which contains "Mouseman" pews, fittings and other furniture. The company is now known as "Robert Thompson's Craftsmen Ltd – The Mouseman of Kilburn."

Fr Paul Nevill, a former Headmaster of Ampleforth College, asked Thompson to make the Ampleforth Abbey's furniture; the school liked it so much that Ampleforth kept asking Thompson for more work, including the library and most of the main building. Most of Ampleforth College's houses are now decorated with Robert Thompson's furniture.

Others, including former apprentices who continued in his style working in Yorkshire oak, adopted similar identifying marks and nicknames. These makers include Thomas "Gnomeman" Whittaker (1910–1991), Derek "Lizardman" Slater, Colin "Beaverman" Almack, Robert "Rabbitman" Heap, Graham "Swanman" Duncalf, Alan "Acornman" Grainger, Wilf "Squirrelman" Hutchinson, Albert "Eagleman" Jeffray, Malcolm "Foxman" Pipes, and Shaw & Riley "The Seahorsemen of Hessay".

Gallery

Where to see "Mouseman" furniture
Mouseman Visitor Centre

All Saints Church, Allesley
Bangor Cathedral
St Mary's Church, Beverley
Craven Museum & Gallery
The Museum of North Craven Life; The Folly, Settle, North Yorkshire
St Nicholas' Church, Stevenage, pews (1964)

References

External links

Company homepage
How do you tell if it is a genuine 'Mouseman' item?
Dedication board in Old Malton War Memorial Hall, quite close to Kilburn

1876 births
1955 deaths
People from Hambleton District
British furniture designers
British furniture makers
English woodcarvers
Place of death missing